Alexander Leake (11 July 1871 – 29 March 1938), known as Alex or Alec Leake, was an English professional footballer who won five caps for his country and made 407 appearances in the Football League playing as a half back for Small Heath, Aston Villa and Burnley. After retiring from playing he took up coaching, both with professional clubs and at school level. He was a cousin of fellow Small Heath and England forward Jimmy Windridge.

Biography 

Leake was born in Small Heath, Birmingham. After leaving school he trained as a blacksmith with Hoskins & Sewell, manufacturers of metal bedsteads, in the Bordesley district of Birmingham, and played for the works football team. He later helped Old Hill Wanderers win the championship of the Birmingham & District League in the 1893–94 season. His success with Old Hill did not go unnoticed, and he signed for Small Heath, newly promoted to the Football League First Division, in July 1894.

Leake made his Small Heath debut in October 1895 at left half, but from midway through that season (in which the club were relegated) for the following four years he rarely missed a game at centre-half. He was soon appointed captain. When he did suffer an injury early in the 1899–1900 season, inside forward Walter Wigmore was tried at centre-half, and by the time Leake regained fitness, his position was taken. He played the remainder of his Small Heath career at left-half or occasionally inside-left. He helped the club gain promotion back to the First Division in 1901, but left at the end of the 1901–02 season when they were relegated again. During this season he played in an England trial match and with clubmate Sid Wharton played for an England XI in an unofficial international against Germany. In a 1901 profile of the Small Heath club and players in the Daily Express, C.B. Fry wrote:

He joined Aston Villa in July 1902, when he was 31, and stayed five years. In his first season the club were runners-up in the First Division, and in 1905 he played in their 1905 FA Cup Final team which beat Newcastle United 2–0. While with Aston Villa Leake won five official caps for England, making his international debut at the age of 32 on 12 March 1904 in a 3–1 win against Ireland in Belfast.

Leake found himself unwittingly at the centre of one of the great scandals of English football. In the last League game of the 1904–05 season, Manchester City needed to beat Aston Villa to win the title. It was a spiteful game, and he had been involved in confrontations, both physical and verbal, with opponents. Afterwards Leake, who had captained the side, claimed that City's Billy Meredith had offered him a bribe of £10 for his team to throw the match. Meredith was found guilty by the Football Association, fined, and suspended from all football for 18 months. Because his club refused to help him financially, Meredith made public the illegal payments Manchester City were making to their players. An FA investigation resulted in life bans for directors, long suspensions for players, and the club being forced to sell its playing staff.

An Aston Villa match programme of 1906 describes him as:

Burnley manager Spen Whittaker took him to the club in December 1907, by which time he was 36 years old. He stayed with them a further two-and-a-half years, playing a significant part in building a team for the future. His arrival has been described thus:

When Burnley were promoted to the First Division in 1913, Leake was long gone, but he played his part. At the celebration dinner, the club chairman commented that:

In 1910 he returned to the Midlands and played for one season with Wednesbury Old Athletic, newly elected to the Birmingham & District League. He then took up posts as trainer with Crystal Palace, Merthyr Town, and Walsall, and also coached at school level.

Leake died in his native Birmingham at the age of 66.

Honours 

Old Hill Wanderers
 Birmingham & District League champions 1894
Small Heath
 Second Division promotion 1900–01
Aston Villa
 First Division runners up 1902–03
 FA Cup winners 1905
Wednesbury Old Athletic
 Wednesbury Charity Cup joint winners 1911

References 
General

 For league statistics and clubs played for: 
 For clubs' league positions: 
 For Wednesbury Old Athletic information: 
Specific

External links 

Profile at Aston Villa Player Database.

1871 births
People from Small Heath, Birmingham
Footballers from Birmingham, West Midlands
1938 deaths
English footballers
Association football wing halves
England international footballers
Coventry City F.C. players
Old Hill Wanderers F.C. players
Birmingham City F.C. players
Aston Villa F.C. players
Burnley F.C. players
Wednesbury Old Athletic F.C. players
English Football League players
English Football League representative players
FA Cup Final players